Casearia barteri is a species of flowering plant in the family Salicaceae. It is found in Angola, Cameroon, Central African Republic, the Republic of the Congo, the Democratic Republic of the Congo, Ivory Coast, Equatorial Guinea, Gabon, Ghana, Liberia, Nigeria, São Tomé and Príncipe, Sierra Leone, and Sudan.

References

barteri
Least concern plants
Taxonomy articles created by Polbot